Zimní stadion Luďka Čajky is an indoor sporting arena located in Zlín, Czech Republic. The capacity of the arena is 7,000 people and was built in 1957. It was named after Zlín hockey player Ludek Čajka, who was fatally wounded during a game in Košice. It is currently home to the PSG Berani Zlín ice hockey team.

Indoor ice hockey venues in the Czech Republic
Sport in Zlín
Buildings and structures in Zlín
1955 establishments in Czechoslovakia
Sports venues completed in 1955
20th-century architecture in the Czech Republic